Paeng may refer to:

 Paeng, a Filipino nickname for Rafael 
 Paeng, a Korean surname originating from the Chinese surname Peng
 Paeng, Laotian dried fermentation starter
 Paeng, flour in Thai cuisine
 Typhoon Paeng, name for multiple Western Pacific typhoons

People

 Paeng Nepomuceno (born 1957), Filipino bowler
 Paeng, a nickname for Rafael Hechanova, Filipino basketball player
 Paeng, a nickname for Rafael M. Salas, Filipino businessman
 Paeng, a nickname for Rafael Buenaventura, Filipino businessman
 Ka Paeng, nickname for Rafael V. Mariano, Filipino politician

Characters
 Paeng, a character in the Filipino series The Greatest Love
 Paeng, a character in the comedy horror film Shake, Rattle and Roll IX
 Miss Paeng, a character in the South Korean drama film Heartbreak Library

See also
 Pang (disambiguation)
 Peng (disambiguation)
 Ping (disambiguation)